Michael Kenneth Delanty (15 October 1936 – 6 July 2021) was an Australian rules footballer who played for Collingwood and North Melbourne in the Victorian Football League (VFL).

A strong marking half back, Delanty came to Collingwood from Tasmania. He was the centre half-back in his club's 1958 premiership team and also played in the side which lost the 1960 Grand Final.

In 1963 he crossed to North Melbourne and the following season brought up his 100th career game, eventually finishing with 141.

Delanty was captain / coach of VFA – Division Two club, Camberwell Football Club from 1967 to 1969.

He was the older brother of St Kilda player John Delanty and Collingwood player Bob Delanty.

Delanty was inducted into the Tasmanian Football Hall of Fame.

References

External links

Mike Delanty's playing statistics from The VFA Project
Holmesby, Russell and Main, Jim (2007). The Encyclopedia of AFL Footballers. 7th ed. Melbourne: Bas Publishing.

1936 births
2021 deaths
City-South Football Club players
Collingwood Football Club players
Collingwood Football Club Premiership players
North Melbourne Football Club players
Camberwell Football Club players
Camberwell Football Club coaches
Tasmanian Football Hall of Fame inductees
One-time VFL/AFL Premiership players
Australian rules footballers from Tasmania